This is a comprehensive index of commercial role-playing video games, sorted chronologically by year. Information regarding date of release, developer, publisher, operating system, subgenre and notability is provided where available. The table can be sorted by clicking on the small boxes next to the column headings. This list does not include MUDs or MMORPGs. It does include roguelikes, action RPGs and tactical RPGs.

 1975–1985
 1986–1987
 1988–1989
 1990–1991
 1992–1993
 1994–1995
 1996–1997
 1998–1999
 2000–2001
 2002–2003
 2004–2005
 2006–2007
 2008–2009
 2010–2011
 2012–2013
 2014–2015
 2016–2017
 2018–2019
 2020–2021

Role-playing
Video games